Marco Heriberto Orozco Ruiz Velasco (born 16 Febrero 1959) is a Mexican politician from the National Action Party. From 2006 to 2009 he served as Deputy of the LX Legislature of the Mexican Congress representing Nuevo León.

Primer City Manager del municipio de San Pedro Garza García en Nuevo León.

References

1959 births
Living people
Politicians from Nuevo León
National Action Party (Mexico) politicians
21st-century Mexican politicians
Deputies of the LX Legislature of Mexico
Members of the Chamber of Deputies (Mexico) for Nuevo León